Robert Schultz (born 13 February 1944) is  a former Australian rules footballer who played with Footscray in the Victorian Football League (VFL).

Family
He is the brother of John Schultz.

Notes

References	
 Another Schultz Tooth Goes, The Age, (Monday, 2 September 1963), p.20.

External links 		
 		
 	
				
		
Living people		
1944 births	
People educated at Caulfield Grammar School		
Australian rules footballers from Victoria (Australia)		
Western Bulldogs players